Bilal Çubukçu (born 16 May 1987) is a Turkish professional footballer who plays as a midfielder for Bezirksliga Berlin club Anadoluspor Berlin.

Club career

Youth
Çubukçu grew up in Berlin-Kreuzberg. He played his first youth football at local clubs Anadoluspor Berlin and Rot-Weiß Neukölln. He then joined Tennis Borussia Berlin before moving to Hertha BSC's youth academy in 2002. There, he impressed with his performances that helped the team win the Under 17 Bundesliga in his debut season after a 4–1 win over VfB Stuttgart. The following year, Çubukçu won the U19 DFB-Pokal by beating SGV Freiberg 5–0 in the final in May 2004.

Professional
Çubukçu made his debut for Hertha BSC II in the 2005–06 Regionalliga season, making a total of five appearances. In the following season, he made 22 appearances. However, Hertha's second team were relegated at the end of the season. In 2007–08, Çubukçu helped his club to the league title with 12 goals and 11 assists, which earned him a place in the first team. He was initially allowed to practice there, but was not brought to training camp by coach Lucien Favre, after which he left the club for Turkey and signed a contract with Gençlerbirliği. After some strong initial performances, he became a reserve after a new coach was brought in, whereupon he terminated his contract by mutual consent with the club.

In January 2011, Çubukçu returned to Germany, signing a one-and-a-half-year contract with 2. Bundesliga club Alemannia Aachen. After his contract expired, he left the club. In the following season, he agreed a deal with Turkish second division club Adana Demirspor. He left the club again in the 2012 winter transfer window after his contract was terminated. For the second half of the 2012–13 season, he signed with Turkish third division club Tokatspor. 

Afterwards, stints followed at lower league clubs in Germany. In the summer of 2016, Çubukçu wanted to leave SV Babelsberg 03 after two years and join Turkish third division club Bucaspor, but due to the politically uncertain situation, he changed his mind and renewed his contract with Babelsberg.

For the 2017–18 season, Çubukçu moved to Regionalliga club BFC Dynamo, where he was also immediately named captain. He stayed here for two seasons before returning to Hertha BSC II in July 2019. In September 2020, Çubukçu moved to İzmit to join local football club Kocaelispor.

Later career
In April 2021, Çubukçu signed with NOFV-Oberliga club CFC Hertha 06. After a year, he returned to childhood club Anadoluspor Berlin in the Bezirksliga.

International career
Çubukçu progressed through the youth teams from Turkey U17 to Turkey U21, playing a total of 28 games.

References

External links
 
 
 

1987 births
Living people
Footballers from Berlin
Turkish footballers
Turkey youth international footballers
Turkey under-21 international footballers
Association football midfielders
2. Bundesliga players
Regionalliga players
Süper Lig players
TFF First League players
TFF Second League players
Tennis Borussia Berlin players
Hertha BSC II players
Gençlerbirliği S.K. footballers
Adana Demirspor footballers
Tokatspor footballers
Alemannia Aachen players
Hertha BSC players
Berliner AK 07 players
Berliner FC Dynamo players
SV Babelsberg 03 players
German people of Turkish descent
Kocaelispor footballers
CFC Hertha 06 players
NOFV-Oberliga players